Essex County is a county in the U.S. state of New York. As of the 2020 census, the population was 37,381. Its county seat is the hamlet of Elizabethtown. Its name is from the English county of Essex. Essex is one of only 2 counties that are entirely within the Adirondack Park, the other being Hamilton County.

History
When counties were established in the state of New York in 1683, the present Essex County was part of Albany County. This was an enormous county, including the northern part of New York state as well as all of the present state of Vermont and, in theory, extending westward to the Pacific Ocean. This county was reduced in size on July 3, 1766, by the creation of Cumberland County, and further on March 16, 1770, by the creation of Gloucester County, both containing territory now in Vermont. On March 12, 1772, what was left of Albany County was split into three parts, one remaining under the name Albany County. One  of the other pieces, Charlotte County, contained the eastern portion.

In 1784, the name "Charlotte County" was changed to Washington County to honor George Washington, the American Revolutionary War general and later President of the United States of America.

In 1788, Clinton County was split off from Washington County. This was a much larger area than the present Clinton County, including several other counties or county parts of the present New York state (near Clunes).

Essex County was split from Clinton County in 1799.

Geography

It is the second-largest county in New York by land area and third-largest by total area.

Essex County is in the northeastern part of New York state, just west of Vermont along the eastern boundary of the state. The eastern boundary of Essex County is Lake Champlain, which serves as the New York – Vermont border at an elevation of just under .  The highest natural point in New York, Mount Marcy at 5,344 feet (1,629 m), is in the town of Keene.

The Ausable River forms a partial northern boundary for the county.

Demographics

2020 Census

2000 census
As of the census of 2000, there were 38,851 people, 15,028 households, and 9,828 families residing in the county. The racial makeup of the county was 94.84% White, 2.81% Black or African American, 0.31% Native American, 0.41% Asian, 0.07% Pacific Islander, 0.69% from other races, and 0.86% from two or more races; 2.19% of the population were Hispanic or Latino of any race. Of the population, 22.0% were of French, 16.3% Irish, 13.0% English, 8.6% German, 7.1% American and 6.2% Italian ancestry; 95.2% spoke English, 2.2% Spanish, and 1.3% French as their first language.

There were 15,028 households, out of which 29.20% had children under the age of 18 living with them, 52.20% were married couples living together, 8.90% had a female householder with no husband present, and 34.60% were non-families. 28.30% of all households were made up of individuals, and 12.60% had someone living alone who was 65 years of age or older.  The average household size was 2.39 and the average family size was 2.93.

In the county, the population was spread out, with 22.80% under the age of 18, 6.90% from 18 to 24, 29.80% from 25 to 44, 24.50% from 45 to 64, and 16.00% who were 65 years of age or older.  The median age was 39 years. For every 100 females there were 107.60 males.  For every 100 females age 18 and over, there were 108.60 males.

The median income for a household in the county was $34,823, and the median income for a family was $41,927. Males had a median income of $30,952 versus $22,205 for females. The per capita income for the county was $18,194.  Of the population, 11.60% of individuals, 7.80% of families, 14.50% of those under the age of 18, and 8.60% of those 65 and older, were living below the poverty line.

Education

Private schools
 Mountain Lake Academy
 National Sports Academy
 North Country School
 Northwood School
 St. Agnes School
 St. Mary's School

Higher education
 North Country Community College

Transportation

Airports 
The following public use airports are located in the county:
 Lake Placid Airport (LKP) – Lake Placid
 Marcy Field (1I1) – Keene
 Schroon Lake Airport (4B7) – Schroon Lake
 Ticonderoga Municipal Airport (4B6) – Ticonderoga

Bus 

Essex County Public Transportation operates several accessible bus routes connecting the county's major communities. Between scheduled stops, riders may flag down buses or request to be let off almost anywhere. Riders may also request minor route deviations for a small fee with advanced notice. Fares generally cost a few dollars or less.

In 2020 and 2021, bus service was disrupted by the COVID-19 pandemic.

Routes 

The Champlain North route operates from Elizabethtown north to Wadhams, Whallonsburg, Essex, Willsboro, and to Keeseville, where riders may connect to Clinton County Public Transit bus routes.

The Champlain South route operates from Elizabethtown south to Westport, Mineville, Witherbee, Port Henry, Crown Point, and Ticonderoga. The service partially follows New York State Route 9N. Riders can connect to Amtrak's Adirondack train at Westport station for service to New York City and Montreal.

The Mountain Valley Shuttle operates from Elizabethtown west to Keene, Jay, Au Sable, Wilmington, and Lake Placid. Riders may connect to Clinton County Public Transit bus routes in Au Sable.

The Cascade Express route operates from Elizabethtown west to Keene, North Elba, Lake Placid, and Saranac Lake.

The Lake Placid XPRSS route operates within the village of Lake Placid. The bus is fare-free and supports tourism.

Rail 
Amtrak's Adirondack service travels through Essex County once a day in each direction on its route between New York City and Montreal, stopping in Ticonderoga, Port Henry, Westport and Port Kent (seasonal). Amtrak also offers Thruway Motorcoach service connecting Lake Placid with Westport station.

The service was temporarily suspended as of March 2020 due to the closure of the Canadian/American border in response to the COVID-19 pandemic. As of fall 2022, a service resumption date has not yet been announced.

Communities

Larger Settlements

† - County Seat

‡ - Not Wholly in this County

Towns

 Chesterfield
 Crown Point
 Elizabethtown
 Essex
 Jay
 Keene
 Lewis
 Minerva
 Moriah
 Newcomb
 North Elba
 North Hudson
 Schroon
 St. Armand
 Ticonderoga
 Westport
 Willsboro
 Wilmington

Hamlets
 Bloomingdale
 North Pole
 Olmstedville
 Port Kent
 Ray Brook

Villages
 Lake Placid

Politics
Essex County is a swing county. It voted for George W. Bush in the 2000 and 2004 elections, switched to Barack Obama in 2008 and 2012 and then flipped to Donald Trump in 2016, then to Joe Biden in 2020. Before 1996, however, Essex, like most of the North Country, was powerfully Republican. Until Bill Clinton won it in 1996, it had voted for a Democratic presidential candidate only once since the Civil War, when Barry Goldwater lost every county in New York State in 1964.

|}

Notable people
 John Brown (1800–1859), an abolitionist who owned a farm in North Elba. His sons John Jr., Watson, and Owen all lived, when young, on their father's farm.
 Sophie Clarke (born 1989), winner of Survivor: South Pacific, from Willsboro.
 Vincent Colyer (1825–1888), was a successful American artist and humanitarian who worked to help freedmen and Native Americans; he was born in Bloomingdale.
 Henry Debosnys (1836–1883), Portuguese-born wife murderer and cryptographer
 Francis Donnelly of Olmstedville (1903–1980), at the time of his death in 1980 was the longest continually serving town elected official in the United States, having served as the Town of Minerva Supervisor and as that town's representative at the county level for 46 years
 Carlton Foster (1826–1901), Wisconsin lumberman, Wisconsin state legislator, and mayor of Oshkosh, Wisconsin.
 Robert Garrow, serial killer in the Syracuse area in the 1970s. He grew up in Moriah.
 Ben Goldwasser (born 1983), keyboardist for psychedelic rock band MGMT. He grew up in Westport.
 Elizabeth Woolridge Grant (born 1985), known professionally as Lana Del Rey, grew up in the town of Lake Placid.
 Inez Milholland (1886–1916), leader in the women's suffrage movement, is buried in Lewis Cemetery. Her family had a summer home in Westport, which is now the Meadowmount School of Music.
 Solomon Northup (1808 –  1863), born in Minerva as a free man, he was kidnapped and sold into slavery in 1841. Regaining freedom in 1853, he published his memoir that year, became nationally known and lectured on the abolitionist circuit. He became an inspiration for the 2013 film 12 Years a Slave.
 Johnny Podres (1932–2008), pitcher for Brooklyn Dodgers and 1955 World Series MVP, was born in Witherbee.
 Tom Tyler, silent film star, originally from Mineville.
 Eli Winch (1848–1938), born in the town of Wilmington, a member of the Wisconsin State Assembly and manufacturer.

See also

 List of counties in New York
 Adirondack County, New York—a proposed new county
 National Register of Historic Places listings in Essex County, New York

References

Further reading

External links
  Essex County
  Adirondack Almanack
 Essex County history pages
 North Country Community College
 Wilmington (Town of) Historical Society 
 

 
1799 establishments in New York (state)
Adirondack Park
Populated places established in 1799